is a Japanese professional footballer who plays as a centre back for  club V-Varen Nagasaki.

Career
After graduating in four years at Ryutsu Keizai University, in January 2018 Imazu joined Ventforet Kofu.

Club statistics
.

References

External links

 Profile at Sanfrecce Hiroshima

1995 births
Living people
Association football people from Yamanashi Prefecture
Japanese footballers
J1 League players
J2 League players
Ventforet Kofu players
Sanfrecce Hiroshima players
V-Varen Nagasaki players
Association football defenders